Oleh Shturbabin (in Ukrainian ; born 22 July 1984) is a Ukrainian sabre fencer, bronze medallist in the 2005 World Fencing Championships and silver team medallist in the 2006 World Fencing Championships.

Career

Shturbabin is the son of fencing coach Valery Shturbabin, who currently trains Ukraine's national sabre team. He  took up fencing at the age of six. His first major award was a bronze medal at the 2001 Cadet World Championships in Gdańsk, followed by a team bronze medal at the Junior World Championships. He was offered a scholarship by an American college, but he refused as he did not want to move.

He competed at the 2004 Summer Olympics, finishing in sixth position in the sabre event. With Dmytro Boiko, Volodymyr Lukashenko and Vladyslav Tretiak, he won the silver medal in the sabre team event at the 2006 World Fencing Championships after losing to France in the final. At the 2010 European Fencing Championships he won the bronze medal in the Sabre individual event.

Shturbabin graduated from the Khmelnytskyi National University.

References

External links
 Profile at the European Fencing Confederation

1984 births
Living people
Ukrainian male sabre fencers
Olympic fencers of Ukraine
Fencers at the 2004 Summer Olympics
Universiade medalists in fencing
Sportspeople from Baku
Universiade gold medalists for Ukraine
Medalists at the 2011 Summer Universiade